Phosphenium ions, not to be confused with phosphonium or phosphirenium, are divalent cations of phosphorus of the form [PR2]+. Phosphenium ions have long been proposed as reaction intermediates.

Synthesis

Legacy methods
The first cyclic phosphenium compounds were reported in 1972 by Suzanne Fleming and coworkers. Acyclic phosphenium compounds were synthesized by Fleming's thesis advisor Robert Parry in 1976.

Methods
Several methods exist for the preparation of two-coordinate phosphorus ions.  A common method involves halide abstraction from  halophosphines: 
R2PCl  +  AlCl3   →   [R2P+][]

Protonolysis of tris(dimethylamino)phosphine affords the phosphenium salt:
P(NMe2)3  +  2 HOTf   →   [P(NMe2)2]OTf  +  [HNMe2]OTf
Weakly coordinating anions are desirable. Triflic acid is often used.

N-heterocyclic phosphenium (NHP) have also been reported. Reaction of PI3 with the α-diimine yields the NHP cation by reduction of the diimine and oxidation of iodine.

Structure and bonding
According to X-ray crystallography, [(i-Pr2N)2P]+ is nearly planar consistent with sp2-hybridized phosphorus center. The planarity of the nitrogen center is consistent with the resonance of the lone pair of the nitrogen atom as a pi bond to the empty phosphorus 3p orbital perpendicular to the N−P−N plane. An idealized sp2 phosphorus center would expect an N−P−N angle of 120°.

Calculations also show that the analogy to carbenes is lessened by strongly π-donating substituents. With NH2 substituents, the phosphenium cation assumes allyl character. Generalized Valence Bond (GVB) calculations of the phosphenium ions as having a singlet ground state, singlet-triplet separation increases with increasing electronegativity of the ligands. Additionally, the triplet state of the phosphenium ion displays a greater bond angle at the phosphorus. Calculated bond lengths between the two states are not significantly impacted.

Reactivity 

Phosphenium is isoelectronic with singlet (Fisher) carbenes and are therefore expected to be Lewis acidic.  Adducts are produced by combining [P(NMe2)2]+ and P(NMe2)3: 
P(NMe2)2]+ + P(NMe2)3  →  [(Me2N)3P−P(NMe2)2]+

Being electrophilic, they undergo C−H insertion reactions.

Reactions with dienes 
Phosphenium intermediates are invoked as intermediates in the McCormack reaction, a method for the synthesis of organophosphorus heterocycles.  An illustrative reaction involves phenyldichlorophosphine and isoprene:

Isolated phosphenium salts undergo this reaction readily.

There are few examples of reactions catalyzed by phosphenium. In 2018, Rei Kinjo and coworkers reported the hydroboration of pyridines by the NHP salt, 1,3,2-diazaphosphenium triflate. The NHP is proposed to act as a hydride transfer reagent in this reaction.

Coordination chemistry 

Phosphenium ions serve as ligands in coordination chemistry. [(R2N)2PFe(CO)4]+ was prepared by two methods: the first being the abstraction of a fluoride ion from (R2N)2(F)PFe(CO)4 by PF5. The second method is the direct substitution reaction of Fe(CO)5 by the phosphenium ion [P(NR2)]+. Related complexes exist of the type Fe(CO)4L, where L = [(Me2N)2P]+, [(Et2N)2P]+, [(Me2N)(Cl)P]+, and [(en)P]+ (en = C2H4(NH2)2).

N-heterocyclic phosphenium-transition metal complexes are anticipated due to their isoelectronicity to N-heterocyclic carbenes. In 2004, Martin Nieger and coworkers synthesized two Cobalt-NHP complexes. Experimental and computation analysis of the complexes confirmed the expected L→M σ donation and the M→L π backbonding, though the phosphenium was observed to have reduced σ donor ability. It was suggested that this is due to the greater s orbital-character of the phosphorus lone pair compared to the lone pair of the analogous carbene. Additional studies of NHP ligands by Christine Thomas and coworkers in 2012, likened the phosphenium to nitrosyl. Nitrosyl is well known for its redox non-innocence, coordinating in either a bent or linear geometry that possess different L–M bonding modes. It was observed that NHPs in complex with a transition metal may have either a planar or pyramidal geometry about the phosphorus, reminiscent of the linear versus bent geometries of nitrosyl. Highly electron-rich metal complexes were observed to have pyramidal phosphorus, while less electron-rich metals showed greater phosphenium character at the phosphorus. Pyramidal phosphorus indicates significant lone pair character at phosphorus, suggesting that the L→M σ donation and the M→L π backbonding interactions have been replaced with M→L σ donation, formally oxidizing the metal center by two electrons.

Additional reading

Cycloadditions

Adducts

Electrophilic reactions

Coordination complexes

References 

Cations
Phosphorus compounds